John Eastburn Boswell (March 20, 1947December 24, 1994) was an American historian and a full professor at Yale University. Many of Boswell's studies focused on the issue of religion and homosexuality, specifically Christianity and homosexuality. All of his work focused on the history of those at the margins of society.

His first book, The Royal Treasure: Muslim Communities Under the Crown of Aragon in the Fourteenth Century, appeared in 1977. In 1994, Boswell's fourth book, Same-Sex Unions in Pre-Modern Europe, was published. He died that same year from AIDS-related complications.

Biography

Early life
Boswell was born on March 20, 1947, in Boston, Massachusetts, the son of Colonel Henry Boswell Jr. and Catharine Eastburn Boswell. He earned his AB at the College of William & Mary, and his PhD at Harvard University before being hired to teach at Yale University.

Career
A medieval philologist, Boswell spoke or read several Scandinavian languages, Old Icelandic, German, French, Spanish, Italian, Latin, Greek, early and modern Russian, Old Church Slavonic, Armenian, Persian, Arabic, Hebrew, Syriac, and Akkadian. Boswell received his doctorate 1975 and joined the Yale University history faculty, where his colleagues included John Morton Blum, David Brion Davis, Jaroslav Pelikan, Peter Gay, Hanna Holborn Gray, Michael Howard, Donald Kagan, Howard R. Lamar, Jonathan Spence, Robin Winks, William Cronon, and Edmund Morgan. Boswell was made full professor in 1982, and A. Whitney Griswold Professor of History in 1990.

Books
The Royal Treasure (1977) is a detailed historical study of the Mudéjar Muslims in Aragon in the 14th century.

Christianity, Social Tolerance, and Homosexuality (1980) is a work which, according to George Chauncey et al. (1989), "offered a revolutionary interpretation of the Western tradition, arguing that the Roman Catholic Church had not condemned gay people throughout its history, but rather, at least until the twelfth century, had alternately evinced no special concern about homosexuality or actually celebrated love between men."  The book won a National Book Award and the Stonewall Book Award in 1981, but Boswell's thesis was criticized by Warren Johansson, Wayne R. Dynes, and John Lauritsen, who believed that he had attempted to whitewash the historic crimes of the Christian Church against gay men.

The Kindness of Strangers: Child Abandonment in Western Europe from Late Antiquity to the Renaissance (1988) is a scholarly study of the widespread practice of abandoning unwanted children and the means by which society tries to care for them. The title, as Boswell states in the Introduction, is inspired by a puzzling phrase Boswell had found in a number of documents: aliena misericordia, which might at first seem to mean "a strange kindness", is better translated "the kindness of strangers," echoing the line "I have always depended on the kindness of strangers" from A Streetcar Named Desire by Tennessee Williams.

The Marriage of Likeness: Same-Sex Unions in Pre-Modern Europe (New York: Villard, 1994) argues that the adelphopoiia liturgy was evidence that the attitude of the Christian church towards homosexuality has changed over time, and that early Christians did on occasion accept same-sex relationships.

Rites of so-called "same-sex union" (Boswell's proposed translation) occur in ancient prayer-books of both the western and eastern churches. They are rites of adelphopoiesis, literally Greek for the making of brothers. Boswell stated that these should be regarded as sexual unions similar to marriages. Boswell made many detailed translations of these rites in Same-Sex Unions, and stated that one mass gay wedding occurred only a couple of centuries ago in the Archbasilica of Saint John Lateran, the cathedral seat of the Pope as Bishop of Rome. This is a highly controversial point of Boswell's text, as other scholars have dissenting views of this interpretation, and believe that they were instead rites of becoming adopted brothers, or "blood brothers." Boswell pointed out such evidence as an icon of two saints, Sergius and Bacchus (at St. Catherine's on Mount Sinai), and drawings, such as one he interprets as depicting the wedding feast of Emperor Basil I to his "partner", John. Boswell sees Jesus as fulfilling the role of the "pronubus" or in modern parallel, best man.

Boswell's methodology and conclusions have been disputed by many historians. James Brundage, professor of history and law at the University of Kansas, observed that "the mainstream reaction was that he raised some interesting questions, but hadn't proved his case."

The Irish historian and journalist Jim Duffy, in his "Rite and Reason" column in The Irish Times, praised Boswell's work. Welsh LGBT historian Norena Shopland, in Forbidden Lives, examines a number of translations of Gerald of Wales's extract from the third book of Topographia Hiberniae, "A proof of the iniquity (of the Irish) and a novel form of marriage". Shopland shows how all translations currently being used were originally made before homosexuality was legal, and so reflect those times. She includes evidence supporting Boswell's translation of "marriage" and not, as others claim "a treaty".

Faith and sexuality
Boswell was a Roman Catholic, having converted from the Episcopal Church of his upbringing at the age of 15. He remained a daily-mass Catholic until his death, despite differences with the church over sexual issues. Although he was orthodox in most of his beliefs, he strongly disagreed with his church's stated opposition to homosexual behavior and relationships. He was partnered with Jerone Hart for some twenty years until his death. Hart and Boswell are buried together at Grove Street Cemetery, New Haven, Connecticut.

In "Revolutions, Universals, and Sexual Categories", Boswell compares the constructionist–essentialist positions to the realist–nominalist dichotomy. He also lists three types of sexual taxonomies:
 All or most humans are polymorphously sexual... external accidents, such as socio-cultural pressure, legal sanctions, religious beliefs, historical or personal circumstances determine the actual expression of each person's sexual feelings.
 Two or more sexual categories, usually, but not always based on sexual object choice.
 One type of sexual response [is] normal... all other variants abnormal.

Death
Boswell died of complications from AIDS in the Yale infirmary in New Haven, Connecticut, on December 24, 1994, aged 47.

Legacy

During the late 1980s, the influence of Michel Foucault's writings led to the emergence of a social constructivist view of human sexuality which emphasised the historical and cultural specificity of sexual identities such as 'heterosexual' and 'homosexual'. Despite Boswell's friendly relations with Foucault, he remained adamantly opposed to the French theorist's views, which he characterised as a reemergence of medieval nominalism, and defended his own striking essentialism in the face of changing academic fashions. 
Since his death, Boswell's work has come under criticism from certain medievalists and queer theorists, who—while acknowledging his personal courage in bringing the issue of sexuality into the academy—have argued it is an anachronism to speak of "gay people" in pre-modern societies and have questioned the validity of Boswell's conclusions. 
Several other scholars, including Terry Castle, Ruth Vanita, and Rictor Norton, have followed in Boswell's footsteps, building up the field of lesbian and gay studies (as distinct from queer theory), and proposing that categorizations of humans by sexual predilection much predate the 19th century (where Foucault and his followers place it), both in the West (as in Plato's Symposium) and in other cultures (e.g., India).
In 2006, Boswell was named with online resources as an LGBT History Month Icon.
The College of William & Mary announced in late April 2021 that an academic building would be renamed in Boswell's honor.
In her 2013 book The Gentrification of the Mind: Witness to a Lost Imagination, Sarah Schulman censures Boswell in the following passage:
[A]lthough I have spent thirty years of my life writing about the heroism of gay men, I have also come to understand their particular brand of cowardice. There is a destructive impulse inside many white gay men, where they become cruel or child-like or spineless out of a rage about not having the privileges that straight men of our race take for granted. They have grief about not being able to subjugate everyone else at will. Sometimes this gets expressed in a grandiose yet infantile capitulation to the powers that be—even at the expense of their own community. Professor John Boswell stopped the Center for Lesbian and Gay Studies (CLAGS) from coming to Yale because he insisted that its board be composed entirely of full professors, in an era in which there were no out-of-the-closet lesbian or nonwhite gay full professors in the country. CLAGS refused, and was moved by its founder Martin Duberman to the City University Graduate Center. Boswell died of AIDS, abandoned by the social system he so strongly defended.

Works
 The Royal Treasure: Muslim Communities Under the Crown of Aragon in the Fourteenth Century (1977)–Online
 Christianity, Social Tolerance, and Homosexuality: Gay People in Western Europe from the Beginning of the Christian Era to the Fourteenth Century (1980) — winner of the National Book Award,  
 Rediscovering Gay History: Archetypes of Gay Love in Christian History (1982)
 The Kindness of Strangers: The Abandonment of Children in Western Europe from Late Antiquity to the Renaissance (1989)
 Homosexuality in the Priesthood and the Religious Life (1991) (co-author)
 Same-Sex Unions in Pre-Modern Europe (1994), Villard Books,

See also
 Adelphopoiesis
 The Bible and homosexuality
 Alan Bray
 Queer studies
 Queer theology

Notes

References

Footnotes

Bibliography
 Boswell, John (1989, 1982). "Revolutions, Universals, and Sexual Categories", Hidden from History: Reclaiming the Gay & Lesbian Past, Chauncey et al., eds. New York: Meridian, New American Library, Penguin Books. .
 Chauncey et al., eds (1989). "Introduction", Hidden from History: Reclaiming the Gay & Lesbian Past (1990), New York: Meridian, New American Library, Penguin Books. .

External links

 PEOPLE WITH A HISTORY: John Boswell
 The Life of St. Theodore of Sykeon (7th Century) 
 Royal Treasure: Muslim Communities Under the Crown of Aragon in the Fourteenth Century
 YAMP: John Boswell 
 John Boswell Papers (MS 1974). Manuscripts and Archives, Yale University Library.

1947 births
1994 deaths
20th-century American historians
20th-century American male writers
20th-century philologists
AIDS-related deaths in Connecticut
American male non-fiction writers
American philologists
American Roman Catholics
College of William & Mary alumni
Converts to Roman Catholicism from Anglicanism
Gay academics
American gay writers
Harvard University alumni
Historians from Massachusetts
Historians of LGBT topics
LGBT historians
LGBT people from Massachusetts
LGBT Roman Catholics
National Book Award winners
Roman Catholic writers
Stonewall Book Award winners
Writers from Boston
Yale University faculty